KSVR (91.7 FM) is a radio station broadcasting a variety and Regional Mexican format. Licensed to broadcast from Mount Vernon, Washington, United States, the station serves all of Skagit County; the station is currently owned by Board of Trustees of Skagit Valley College.

History
KSVR launched its first broadcast in May 1973 on 90.1 FM from the campus of Skagit Valley College in Mount Vernon, Washington.  The station's broadcast frequency later moved to 91.7 FM in 2002 after a signal conflict with Washington State University's KMWS that began in March 1997.

Programming
KSVR's programming includes Spanish-language music and information, folk, bluegrass, hip-hop, jazz, oldies, and various international music formats to news-talk and locally focused informational programs.  The station also broadcasts program selections from NPR.

See also
List of community radio stations in the United States

References

External links

SVR
Regional Mexican radio stations in the United States
Community radio stations in the United States